David Shelby Walker (May 2, 1815 – July 20, 1891) was the eighth Governor of Florida, serving from 1866 to 1868.

Early life and career
Walker was born near Russelville in Logan County, Kentucky. He attended private schools in Kentucky and Tennessee and studied law. He moved to Florida in 1837, settling in Leon County. His father was David Walker, a prominent early Kentucky politician who served in the U.S. House of Representatives. David S. Walker was a cousin and close business and political confidante of Florida territorial governor Richard K. Call. He was also related to Florida Senator Wilkinson Call, who was Walker's law partner for several years in the 1850s and 1860s in Tallahassee.

Walker entered politics as a Whig, and was elected to the first session of the Florida State Legislature in 1845, serving Wakulla and Leon Counties as senator. In 1848, he was elected by Leon County to the Florida House of Representatives. In 1849 he was appointed Register of Public Lands and was ex officio State Superintendent of Public Instruction, positions he held until 1854. He advocated and promoted interest in public schools. His efforts resulted in the creation of public schools in Tallahassee. He served as Mayor of Tallahassee. He was the Know Nothing gubernatorial candidate  in 1856 but lost to Democrat Madison S. Perry by 2.6 points. In 1859, he became a Florida Supreme Court Justice. Walker is also known for establishing Tallahassee's first library in the mid-1800s through his private funds in a time where money was not allocated to libraries outside of urban areas, especially in a "rural" state.

Governorship
Prior to the Civil War, Walker was a Constitutional Unionist and so had opposed secession. However, when Florida seceded from the Union in 1861, he supported his state. Following the war, on November 29, 1865, Walker was elected governor unopposed, in an election in which newly freed slaves were not allowed to participate. He was inaugurated on December 20 and took office January 18, 1866.

During his governorship, Florida transitioned from the federal oversight and military occupation of Reconstruction to readmission into the Union, but Walker was a conservative who attempted to minimize changes to the antebellum social, political, and economic system. He protested the election of the 1868 Constitutional Convention, which was convened to adopt a new government that the Republican U.S. Congress would approve, but ultimately supported the 1868 Constitution when it turned out to be less protective of blacks than originally anticipated.

He did not run for reelection in the 1868 election, the first in which African American men could vote.

After leaving the governor's office on July 4, 1868, he returned to practicing law. In 1878, he was appointed circuit court judge, a position he held until his death on July 20, 1891.

Legacy
Tallahassee's first public library is the David S. Walker Library.

See also
 List of United States political appointments across party lines

References

Sources
Official Governor's portrait and biography from the State of Florida
Morris, Allen  and Joan Perry Morris, compilers. The Florida Handbook 2007–2008 31st Biennial Edition. Page 310.  Peninsula Publishing. Tallahassee. 2007.  Softcover  Hardcover

External links

Governors of Florida
Justices of the Florida Supreme Court
Members of the Florida House of Representatives
Florida state senators
1815 births
1891 deaths
Florida Whigs
19th-century American politicians
Florida Constitutional Unionists
Democratic Party governors of Florida
Mayors of Tallahassee, Florida
Florida Democrats
People from Russellville, Kentucky
People from Tallahassee, Florida
19th-century American judges